Svetilnovo is a rural locality (a village) in Lipetskoye Rural Settlement, Verkhovazhsky District, Vologda Oblast, Russia. The population was 31 as of 2002.

Geography 
Svetilnovo is located 51 km southwest of Verkhovazhye (the district's administrative centre) by road. Gridino is the nearest rural locality.

References 

Rural localities in Verkhovazhsky District